Harrow Weald SSSI is a 3.7 hectare (9 acre) geological Site of Special Scientific Interest in Harrow Weald in the London Borough of Harrow. It was formerly part of the Stanmore and Harrow Weald Commons and Bentley Priory SSSI. It is a Geological Conservation Review site.

It provides the most complete exposure of Pleistocene gravel beds above the Claygate Beds, the youngest layer of London Clay. They were formerly thought to have been of marine origin but recent research has cast doubt on this view. It is considered a key site for further studies.

There is no public access but it can be viewed from Common Road and Harrow Weald Common.

See also
List of Sites of Special Scientific Interest in Greater London

References

 

Sites of Special Scientific Interest in London
Geology of London
Geological Conservation Review sites